Gao Gang (1905 – August 1954) was a Communist Party of China (CPC) leader during the Chinese Civil War and the early years of the People's Republic of China (PRC), before becoming the victim of the first major purge within the CPC since before 1949. The events surrounding Gao's purge, the so-called "Gao Gang Affair", are still the subject of debate: a limited amount of research has been done on the topic, partly due to the relatively small amount of information available.

Born in rural Shaanxi province in 1905, Gao Gang joined the CPC in 1926 and led a revolutionary guerrilla base there during the Chinese Civil War.  He was of peasant background with a low level of education: he is said to have not been very literate.  Among his colleagues inside the CPC, he gained a reputation as having great confidence and ambition, as well as of being a womanizer. Trusted by Mao Zedong, Gao was dramatically promoted in the final years of the civil war to become the Party, state and military head of the key Northeast area (Manchuria) of China.  In 1952 he was ordered to Beijing to become head of the State Planning Commission of China (SPC), where he later attempted a leadership challenge against Liu Shaoqi and Zhou Enlai.  His attempt failed and he committed suicide in August 1954.

Guerilla activities in Shaanxi 

When his friend since middle school Liu Zhidan led a failed insurrection in 1928, Gao joined him in remote Northwest Shaanxi, where together they built up a guerrilla base.  The deaths of local guerrilla leaders in the Northwest region distinguished Gao as the symbol of the revolutionary base.  Gao met Mao Zedong in 1935 when the Long March ended in Shaanxi.  The two developed a close relationship based on personal friendship and their agreement on Marxism–Leninism ideological matters.  Gao spent many years during the Chinese Civil War co-ordinating CPC activities and became one of the top commanders in the region.

Northeast China 

In 1945 Gao joined the Politburo, and was transferred along with Lin Biao to northeast China (Dongbei), becoming head of the local Party (Northeastern bureau of CPC), state and military apparatus. By 1947 Gao was the most important cadre in the region.  After the founding of the PRC in 1949, Gao was named one of the six chairmen of the State Council, under Mao Zedong.

Influence from the nearby Soviet Union meant that Soviet ideas of industrial organization and economic planning were prominent, and Gao strongly supported these methods as the area became China's centre of heavy industry.  Due to its economic advancement, the northeast region was often used to test new Communist policies, something that increased both the prestige of the region and that of Gao himself.  Gao also received significant propaganda coverage, as workers and peasants were encouraged to respond to his 'call' for increased industrial production; personal letters supporting him and salutations to his health were also published.

In July 1950, shortly after the outbreak of the Korean War, Gao was placed in command of the 260,000-man "Northern Frontier Guards", stationed along the border with North Korea. Gao was then held responsible for preparing his forces for the possibility of China's participation in the war.  When China finally entered the Korean War in November 1950, Chinese forces were commanded by Peng Dehuai.

Beijing
Gao Gang was transferred to Beijing in 1952 to take up the post of Chairman of the State Planning Commission of China (SPC).  This made him principally responsible for carrying out the First Five Year Plan, which was the national policy that introduced Soviet economic planning into the People's Republic of China.  Gao was also confirmed as a Politburo member, a Vice-Chairman of the Central People's Government Council and a Vice-Chairman of the People's Revolutionary Military Council.  These were key posts, especially his control of the SPC at a time where Sino-Soviet relations were very important, and Gao was seen by both Mao and other senior Party members as a very capable Politburo member.  However, there is some evidence that Gao was reluctant to leave his power base in the Northeast and move to Beijing. 

Although Gao's transfer to Beijing made him more controllable by the Party center, it motivated him to achieve greater advancement within the Party hierarchy. He saw himself as the second most important leader in the PRC, second only to Mao. After his appointment to Beijing, he openly disagreed with the appointment of Party leaders, rather than military leaders, to high government positions. In 1952 and 1953 there were several major changes in the central administrative structure.  Peng Dehuai was recalled from Korea and placed in charge of the Central Military Commission, a post which had previously been held by Zhou Enlai.  After transferring his military responsibilities to Peng, Zhou focused his efforts on devising China's first Five-Year Plan, with the participation of the Soviet Union. Mao indicated that he was not pleased with Zhou's performance; and, in late 1952 and late 1953, Mao initiated a major reshuffling of the central government hierarchy. Several regional commanders, including Gao Gang, Deng Xiaoping, and Rao Shushi, were also transferred to the Beijing to take over responsibilities from Zhou.  Although he technically retained the position of the third most important man in the official hierarchy (after Mao Zedong and Liu Shaoqi), Zhou's position was considerably weakened.

The "Gao Gang Affair"
The so-called “Gao Gang Affair” was Gao Gang's attempt to displace Liu Shaoqi and Zhou Enlai from their key posts in government and to try to increase his own personal standing within the Party.  Gao thought he had Mao Zedong's approval for such a move and he began to approach senior cadres asking for support in the summer of 1953.  His activities were revealed to Mao by Chen Yun and Deng Xiaoping and the Chairman informed Gao that his actions were out of order.  Efforts were then made to deal with the risk to Party unity that Gao's attempts had provoked.  Under considerable pressure, Gao took his own life in August 1954.

Preliminary discussions with Party leaders
Mao had a series of private conversations with Gao in late 1952 or early 1953 where it is believed he expressed a degree of dissatisfaction with Liu and Zhou, apparently remarking that they were too cautious in their attitude towards the pace of socialist transformation in China.  The details of what Mao actually told Gao are still unclear: whether he approved any action towards Liu and Zhou or merely expressed his frustrations to a friend in private. What is significant is that Gao took Mao's words as consent for a move against these two senior cadres.

Following this, Gao approached senior Party members and expressed his views regarding Liu and Zhou, making the important point to hint that he had Mao's approval.  Rao Shushi, a military figure who had his power base in East China and was chief of the Organisational Department of the Central committee, gave his support to Gao.  Immediately after his conference with Rao, Gao toured the southern and eastern provinces in order to discuss his views with other military leaders, primarily Lin Biao, Peng Dehuai, and Zhu De.

Lin Biao gave no practical support, but his agreement with Gao's views possibly influenced Gao to continue to seek backing.  Peng Dehuai, who was known to have some antipathy against Gao's main target Liu Shaoqi, also expressed some support, but like Lin he did nothing in particular to aid Gao.  When Gao approached Luo Ronghuan, Luo demanded to know Mao's exact thoughts.  He was doubtful whether Mao had actually endorsed such suggestions and told Gao that their discussion on a matter of such significance was inappropriate.

Negative Party reactions and death
When Gao expressed his thoughts to Li Xiannian, Chen Yun and Deng Xiaoping, they were all concerned that his attempts were a clear threat to Party unity. Chen and Li informed Zhou Enlai first about Gao's activities and then spoke to Mao. Deng spoke to Mao directly about Gao's approach.  At a Politburo meeting on 24 December 1953, Mao confronted Gao and gave him a serious warning that his activities were a severe threat to Party unity.  At the conference, Mao's position was clear: he condemned Gao for forming "an anti-Party alliance".

This effectively marked the end of Gao's attempts to advance his position as he realised that he did not in fact have Mao's support. Mao then entrusted Liu Shaoqi, one of the targets of Gao's brief attempt to gain power, with the organisation of a plenum in February 1954 that would focus on Party unity.  Mao's reaction could be seen as a signal of both Mao's lack of tolerance for those who sought to threaten the integrity of the CPC, and a public endorsement of Liu.  

At the February discussion meetings, Zhou Enlai made various charges against Gao Gang.  Zhou accused Gao first of setting up an 'independent kingdom', a reference to Gao's power base in the northeast; and second of having 'mixed up right and wrong in Soviet relations', a hint at Gao's alleged close ties to the USSR; and finally of 'fabricating Comrade Mao Zedong's words', as Gao had told others that his plans had Mao's support.  Zhou publicly contradicted Gao's belief that the military should play a preeminent role in the politics of the PRC, deplored Gao's attempts to spread "rumors" about Liu and other leaders, and concluded that Gao's intention was to sow discord and to usurp power within the Party and the state. Zhou also condemned Gao's dissolute lifestyle.

Apparently distraught, Gao made several attempts to talk to Mao but was refused an audience with the Chairman. It is possible that Mao avoided facing Gao because of the secret talks between the two men that had prompted Gao's attempts to advance his own position.  Gao tried to shoot himself during the February meetings and succeeded in poisoning himself in August 1954. After his suicide, in 1955, Gao was formally expelled from the Party. Gao's ally, Rao, was also expelled from the Party, and was jailed until his death in 1975. Gao's death not only brought closure of the most immediate sort to the “Affair”, it made sure that he was duly remembered in a dishonourable fashion as a traitor to the Party.

Analysis
Gao's assumption that Mao would support the elimination of Zhou and Liu, despite Mao's dissatisfaction with them, was mistaken. At the time, Mao was still relatively tolerant of differing opinions, but was confident that both Liu and Zhou would align their views with Mao if pressed. Mao was satisfied with the "unity" that had been achieved by the Yan'an Rectification Movement, and had no intention of altering the basic Party structure that had been established at the 1945 Party Congress. Mao disagreed with Gao's own opinion of his role in the revolution (which Mao thought was inflated), and clearly believed that the Party should retain a clear command over the state and the military. If Gao's views of the importance of the army in the revolution had prevailed, they would have contradicted Mao's interpretation of CPC history, and would have threatened Mao's preeminent position of leadership.

The “Gao Gang Affair” showed the real risk of factional splits within the Communist Party of China during the first few years of the People's Republic, a period that is often seen to be an era of Party unity.  By attempting to exploit grievances held by some cadres against others, Gao was able to attract the interests of several significant cadres, even if none of them truly backed him.  The “Gao Gang Affair” can simply be viewed as a  stillborn coup attempt within the Politburo, but its significance is not that it failed to succeed or even to gather basic support.  Rather, it showed that there was the possibility of power struggles within the Party that could involve the targeting of very senior Party members.  Following the “Gao Gang Affair” there were calls for greater Party unity and there was an increase in centralisation as the old regional administrations with their Party and military bodies were abolished, a change that had been planned for some time but that was no doubt spurred on by Gao's attempts to use his regional power to gain power at the centre.

Another factor that has often been explored, and probably had great importance at the time, is the Soviet connection. Gao's attempt to gain power was certainly not seen as a Soviet-backed move against the Chinese Communists, but it is certain that Gao's connections with the USSR made people suspicious of him.  At a time when Sino-Soviet relations were close but tense, as the CPC endorsed Soviet methods of economic planning but wanted to make sure that the USSR did not gain increased influence over the PRC, the impression (however slight) that Gao's attempts to gain power might have had links to his friendship with the Soviets would have been viewed with alarm. This can be seen in Zhou Enlai's public comments against Gao at the February 1954 discussion meetings where he charged him with having 'mixed up right and wrong in Soviet relations'. According to the account Nikita Khrushchev provides in his memoirs, Gao Gang was the USSR′s leadership′s primary source of information about "the mood in the Chinese Party" and Stalin, apparently driven by the desire to win Mao′s trust, handed some of the diplomatic cables from Soviet Ambassador Aleksandr Panyushkin over to Mao. In Khrushchev′s opinion, this "betrayal" by Stalin was key to Gao Gang′s subsequent fate. 

Perhaps even more significant is how the case shows the dominating power and manipulation of Mao Zedong, during a period when, as is often assumed, Mao's commitment to democratic intra-Party decision-making was at its highest. It was Mao's comments that influenced Gao and led him to believe that, even though he was going against the Party and senior cadres, his actions were justified because he had the Chairman's backing.  Senior cadres like Lin Biao and Peng Dehuai expressed their (admittedly limited) support only because they thought Gao had Mao's approval. The entire plot (if it indeed can be called that) was ended in one stroke by Mao, who needed only to express his true thoughts at one Politburo meeting in order to stop Gao's activities and make other cadres admit their mistakes. Mao's role in the whole affair can be seen as very important indeed.

References

1905 births
1954 deaths
Chinese Communist Party politicians from Shaanxi
Politicians from Yulin, Shaanxi
Vice presidents of the People's Republic of China
People's Republic of China politicians from Shaanxi
Members of the 7th Politburo of the Chinese Communist Party
Chinese politicians who committed suicide
Suicides by poison
1954 suicides